John Paul Lehoczky (born June 29, 1943) is an American statistician, currently the Thomas Lord Professor Emeritus at Carnegie Mellon University. He received his PhD in 1969 at Stanford under Herbert Solomon.

References

Living people
Carnegie Mellon University faculty
American statisticians
Stanford University alumni
Place of birth missing (living people)
1943 births